Marie Blanche Selva (Catalan Blanca Selva i Henry, 29 January 18843 December 1942) was a French pianist, music educator, writer and composer of Spanish origin.

Biography
Blanche Selva was born in Brive-la-Gaillarde in Corrèze. As a child she studied piano with a number of teachers, took preparatory classes with Sophie Chéné, and was admitted to the Paris Conservatory in 1893. She studied with S. Chéné and won a medal in competition, but left the Conservatory without graduating.

Her family moved to Geneva, and Selva began giving concerts at the age of 13 in Lausanne. She studied with Vincent d'Indy, and became a professor at the Schola Cantorum de Paris in December 1901, later taking positions at the Conservatoire de Strasbourg, the École Normale de Musique in Paris, and the Prague Conservatory. Blanche Selva was the only French pianist of her time to specialise in Czech music, and she was consequently very popular in Czechoslovakia. She continued to tour and work as a concert pianist in Europe.  By the age of 20 she had performed all of J.S. Bach's keyboard works in 17 recitals.  Between 1906 and 1909 she premiered all four books of Isaac Albéniz's piano suite Iberia.

In January 1925 Selva moved to Barcelona, where she founded her own music school and performed in a duo with violinist Joan Massià. In 1930 she developed a paralysis that ended her performing career, but she continued teaching, writing and composing.

In 1936 she left Barcelona because of the Spanish Civil War and lived for a while in Marseille, then Moulins, Allier, and Saint-Saturnin, Puy-de-Dôme, Auvergne. Suffering from cancer, she entered a hospital in Saint-Amant-Tallende, where she died in December 1942 at age 59.

Writings
Blanche Selva was active as a translator and transcriber. But her main work is a monumental 7-volumes work on piano technique:
L'Enseignement musical de la Technique du Piano, Paris from 1916 to 1925

This book propose a radically new approach to piano playing. Her predilection for big arm gestures and her detailed descriptions of the most unusual types of attack, combined with the constant attention to the resulting tone-color, make his book a unique contribution to the history of the piano and its literature.

She also published professional articles in magazines and journals including Tablettes de la Schola, Le Monde Musical, La Revue Musicale and Le Revista Musical Catalana. Her other writings include:
The Sonata, Study of its historical and expressive for the interpretation and hearing, Paris 1913
"Sonatas para piano de Beethoven", Barcelona 1927
Déodat de Séverac, Paris 1930

Works
Selected compositions include:

Music for piano/organ
Paysage au soleil couchant (1904)
Suite (Prélude, Allemande, Courante, Burla, Chanson, Farandole) for piano (1904)
Cloches dans la brume for piano (1905)
Cloches au soleil for piano (1905)
Pièces for piano (1908)
Petite pièce for organ (1908)
La Vasque aux Colombes (1921)
Primers Jocs for piano (1931)
Le jeu du pentacorde qui vole, exercise for piano (1940)
Transcriptions pour piano d'œuvres de Vincent d'Indy et César Franck (1910–1912)

Vocal and choral music
Les Ancêtres du Lys (1905)
Rosaire d'après Francis Jammes (1906)
Venez sous la tonnelle d'après Francis Jammes (1908)
Muntanya blava for voice and piano (1928)
Mes de Maria for voice and piano (1929)
Dix mélodies sur des poèmes catalans (1935)
La Farigola (1926)
El Tronc (1929)
Quicumque Enim Spiritu Dei Aguntur (1929)
Pensament Matinal (1931)
O Fleurs des fleurs d'après Blanche Selva (1939)

Chamber and orchestral music
La Nit de la Purissima (1929)
Quatre pièces pour violon et piano (1934)
Poème de la Resureccio ou Oratorio pascal (manuscript lost, 1938)

Recordings
Selva's works have been recorded and issued on CD, including:
Blanche Selva, une promenade musicale (Blanche Selva Association and the Centre International Albert Roussel)
Malibran-Music (Association and Blanche Selva 2002).

References

External links

1884 births
1942 deaths
20th-century classical composers
French music educators
French classical composers
French women classical composers
20th-century French women classical pianists
Pupils of Vincent d'Indy
People from Brive-la-Gaillarde
Conservatoire de Paris alumni
Academic staff of the Schola Cantorum de Paris
Academic staff of the École Normale de Musique de Paris
20th-century French composers
Women music educators
20th-century women composers